Corey Antonio Barlow (born November 1, 1970) is a former American football defensive back who played for three seasons in the National Football League (NFL), one season in the World League of American Football (WLAF), and one season in the Arena Football League (AFL).  He was drafted by the Philadelphia Eagles in the fifth round of the 1992 NFL Draft after playing college football for Auburn.

Professional career
Barlow was drafted by the Philadelphia Eagles in the fifth round of the 1992 NFL Draft, but did not play in a game for the team during his rookie season.  He played in 10 games for the team in 1993.  Barlow re-signed with the Philadelphia Eagles on a one-year contract on June 21, 1994, before suffering a torn anterior cruciate ligament in his left knee. He was subsequently placed on injured reserve on August 27, ending his season.  He was drafted by the Amsterdam Admirals in the 18th round of the 1996 WLAF Draft (109th overall) and played for the team in 1996. He played for one season in the Arena Football League in 1999, for the Nashville Kats and the Grand Rapids Rampage.

Coaching career
After his playing career ended, Barlow was an assistant football and track & field coach at Southside High School in Atlanta, Georgia from 2000–2001. He was the football operations manager and defensive backs coach at Morehouse College from 2002–2005, and he was hired by Rhode Island as the team's secondary coach on March 30, 2006. UAB hired Barlow as the team's cornerbacks coach on December 23, 2006.  He was hired by Savannah State as the team's cornerbacks coach in 2012. Savannah State head coach Steve Davenport was fired on April 17, 2013, and Barlow was named interim head coach.

References

External links
Savannah State Tigers football coaching bio

1970 births
Living people
Players of American football from Atlanta
African-American players of American football
American football cornerbacks
Auburn Tigers football players
Philadelphia Eagles players
Amsterdam Admirals players
Nashville Kats players
Grand Rapids Rampage players
Rhode Island Rams football coaches
UAB Blazers football coaches
Savannah State Tigers football coaches
High school football coaches in Georgia (U.S. state)
Morehouse Maroon Tigers football coaches
21st-century African-American sportspeople
20th-century African-American sportspeople